Victorian Arcade, in Walsall, West Midlands, is a shopping arcade in the town centre, built in the 1890s. It is a Grade II listed building;

History and description
The site, formerly the Shambles, a meat market dating from the medieval period, was redeveloped as a shopping arcade in 1895–7. The architect was Jonathon Ellis. Originally named Digbeth Arcade, it has been restored in recent years, and renamed Victorian Arcade. The T shaped plan is unchanged from the original design.

There are entrances on Bradford Street on the north-west, Digbeth Street on the north-east and Lower Hall Lane on the south-east. The frontage on Bradford Street has a first-floor balcony of five bays: there are iron ballustrades, with shops and office chambers behind. There are timber oriel windows on the floor above. There was originally a five-bay upper floor on the Digbeth Street frontage, replaced during the 20th century.

Inside, the arms of the arcade have a barrel-vaulted glass roof; they meet at an octagonal space under a glazed dome. Some of the shop fronts in the arcade are original.

See also
 List of shopping centres in the United Kingdom

References

Shopping arcades in England
Buildings and structures in Walsall
Grade II listed buildings in the West Midlands (county)